Zhaitang Town is a town in the western side of Mentougou District, Beijing, China. It shares border with Guanting Town in the north, Datai Subdistrict and Yanchi Town in the east, Da'anshan and Shijiaying Townships in the south, and QIngshui Town in the west. As of 2020, It had a population of 7,486.

The name Zhaitang came from Lingyue Temple within the town, which had been offering dinner to travelers and visitors during Tang dynasty.

History

Administrative Divisions 
As of 2021, Zhaitang Town was composed of 30 subdivisions, of which 1 was a community and the other 29 were villages:

Climate 

Zhaitang has a humid continental climate (Köppen climate classification Dwa).

See also 

 List of township-level divisions of Beijing

References 

Mentougou District
Towns in Beijing